Ratu Tevita Vakalalabure (1927 – 6 May 2005) was a Fijian chief and politician.

Ratu Vakalalabure claimed to hold the chiefly title of Vunivalu of Natewa, one of the three senior titles in Cakaudrove Province, which was never publicly or officially challenged. He served as a Senator in the 1990s, becoming President of the Senate before winning the Cakaudrove West Fijian Communal Constituency in the House of Representatives in a byelection in 1996.  He was also a member of the Great Council of Chiefs.

Vakalalabure was the father of eight children, including Ratu Rakuita Vakalalabure, who became Deputy Speaker of the House of Representatives in 2001, and subsequently served a prison sentence for his involvement in the coup d'état that deposed the elected government in 2000.

Valalalabure's right to the title of Vunivalu of Natewa was disputed by some from the Natewa region. The last time prior to his death that anyone was officially installed as Vunivalu of Natewa was in September 1974 when Lotaropate Rakuita Saurara (1908-1985 - a.k.a. Ratu Ropate Rakuita) was traditionally installed (as recorded in a local newspaper: Volagauna - Vukelulu, 4 Ni Sepiteba, 1974). Isoa Bativudi, the traditional kingmaker of Natewa, told the Fiji Sun on 5 March 2006 that Vakalalabure's successor as Vunivalu would be installed on 6 October.  He was identified as Ratu Viliame Gasagasa, from the Rakuita family. Gasagasa, however, died before the installation. The leading contenders for the title were Ratu Amenatave Rabelo (a.k.a. Amenatape Belo), and University of the South Pacific Academic, Dr Ropate R. Qalo. Both are senior members of the Rakuita family. Ratu Amenatave Rabelo (a.k.a. Amenatape Belo), who is brother of the previously chosen successor, Ratu Viliame Gasagasa, and son of Lotaropate Saurara (the previous official Vunivalu of Natewa), was traditionally and officially installed as the new Vunivalu of Natewa in October 2010 in Natewa with villagers from Natewa and the region, as well as several outsiders, witnessing the event.

Ratu Amenatave Rabelo died on November 17, 2012, and Ratu Ifereimi Buaserau was traditionally installed as the new Vunivalu of Natewa in March 2014 (see  and ).

References

1927 births
2005 deaths
Fijian chiefs
I-Taukei Fijian members of the House of Representatives (Fiji)
I-Taukei Fijian members of the Senate (Fiji)
Presidents of the Senate (Fiji)
Soqosoqo ni Vakavulewa ni Taukei politicians
Politicians from Natewa